A chiral phenomenon is one that is not identical to its mirror image (see the article on mathematical chirality). The spin of a particle may be used to define a handedness, or helicity, for that particle, which, in the case of a massless particle, is the same as chirality. A symmetry transformation between the two is called parity transformation. Invariance under parity transformation by a Dirac fermion is called chiral symmetry.

Chirality and helicity

The helicity of a particle is positive (“right-handed”) if the direction of its spin is the same as the direction of its motion. It is negative (“left-handed”) if the directions of spin and motion are opposite. So a standard clock, with its spin vector defined by the rotation of its hands, has left-handed helicity if tossed with its face directed forwards.

Mathematically, helicity is the sign of the projection of the spin vector onto the momentum vector: “left” is negative, “right” is positive.

The chirality of a particle is more abstract: It is determined by whether the particle transforms in a right- or left-handed representation of the Poincaré group.

For massless particles – photons, gluons, and (hypothetical) gravitons – chirality is the same as helicity; a given massless particle appears to spin in the same direction along its axis of motion regardless of point of view of the observer.

For massive particles – such as electrons, quarks, and neutrinos – chirality and helicity must be distinguished: In the case of these particles, it is possible for an observer to change to a reference frame moving faster than the spinning particle, in which case the particle will then appear to move backwards, and its helicity (which may be thought of as “apparent chirality”) will be reversed. That is, helicity is a constant of motion, but it is not Lorentz invariant. Chirality is Lorentz invariant, but is not a constant of motion: A massive left-handed spinor, when propagating, will evolve into a right handed spinor over time, and vice versa.

A massless particle moves with the speed of light, so no real observer (who must always travel at less than the speed of light) can be in any reference frame where the particle appears to reverse its relative direction of spin, meaning that all real observers see the same helicity. Because of this, the direction of spin of massless particles is not affected by a change of viewpoint (Lorentz boost) in the direction of motion of the particle, and the sign of the projection (helicity) is fixed for all reference frames: The helicity of massless particles is a relativistic invariant (a quantity whose value is the same in all inertial reference frames) which always matches the massless particles' chirality.

The discovery of neutrino oscillation implies that neutrinos have mass, so the photon is the only confirmed massless particle; gluons are expected to also be massless, although the assumption that they are has not been conclusively tested. Hence, these are the only two particles now known for which helicity could be identical to chirality, and only the photon has been confirmed by measurement. All other observed particles have mass and thus may have different helicities in different reference frames.

Chiral theories
Particle physicists have only observed or inferred left-chiral fermions and right-chiral antifermions engaging in the charged weak interaction. Even in the case of the electrically neutral weak interaction, which can engage with both left- and right-chiral fermions, in most circumstances two left-handed fermions interact more strongly than right-handed or opposite-handed fermions, implying that the universe has a preference for left-handed chirality. This preferential treatment of one chirality over another violates a symmetry that holds for all other forces of nature.

Chirality for a Dirac fermion  is defined through the operator , which has eigenvalues ±1; the eigenvalue's sign is equal to the particle's chirality: +1 for right-handed, −1 for left-handed.

The coupling of the charged weak interaction to fermions is proportional to the first projection operator, which is responsible for this interaction's parity symmetry violation.

Since the helicity of massive particles is frame-dependent, it might seem that the same particle would interact with the weak force according to one frame of reference, but not another. The resolution to this paradox is that the chirality operator is equivalent to helicity for massless fields only, for which helicity is not frame-dependent. By contrast, for massive particles, chirality is not the same as helicity, so there is no frame dependence of the weak interaction: A particle that couples to the weak force in one frame does so in every frame.

A theory that is asymmetric with respect to chiralities is called a chiral theory, while a non-chiral (i.e., parity-symmetric) theory is sometimes called a vector theory. Many pieces of the Standard Model of physics are non-chiral, which is traceable to  anomaly cancellation in chiral theories. Quantum chromodynamics is an example of a vector theory, since both chiralities of all quarks appear in the theory, and couple to gluons in the same way.

The electroweak theory, developed in the mid 20th century, is an example of a chiral theory. Originally, it assumed that neutrinos were massless, and only assumed the existence of left-handed neutrinos (along with their complementary right-handed antineutrinos). After the observation of neutrino oscillations, which imply that neutrinos are massive (like all other fermions) the revised theories of the electroweak interaction now include both right- and left-handed neutrinos. However, it is still a chiral theory, as it does not respect parity symmetry.

The exact nature of the neutrino is still unsettled and so the electroweak theories that have been proposed are somewhat different, but most accommodate the chirality of neutrinos in the same way as was already done for all other fermions.

Chiral symmetry
Vector gauge theories with massless Dirac fermion fields    exhibit chiral symmetry, i.e., rotating the left-handed and the right-handed components independently makes no difference to the theory. We can write this as the action of rotation on the fields:
  and  
or
  and   

With  flavors, we have unitary rotations instead: .

More generally, we write the right-handed and left-handed states as a projection operator acting on a spinor. The right-handed and left-handed projection operators are

and

Massive fermions do not exhibit chiral symmetry, as the mass term in the Lagrangian,  breaks chiral symmetry explicitly.

Spontaneous chiral symmetry breaking may also occur in some theories, as it most notably does in quantum chromodynamics.

The chiral symmetry transformation can be divided into a component that treats the left-handed and the right-handed parts equally, known as vector symmetry, and a component that actually treats them differently, known as axial symmetry. (cf. Current algebra.) A scalar field model encoding chiral symmetry and its breaking is the chiral model.

The most common application is expressed as equal treatment of clockwise and counter-clockwise rotations from a fixed frame of reference.

The general principle is often referred to by the name chiral symmetry. The rule is absolutely valid in the classical mechanics of Newton and Einstein, but results from quantum mechanical experiments show a difference in the behavior of left-chiral versus right-chiral subatomic particles.

Example:  and  quarks in QCD
The Lagrangian reads

In terms of left-handed and right-handed spinors, it reads

(Here,  is the imaginary unit and  the Dirac operator.)

Defining

it can be written as

The Lagrangian is unchanged under a rotation of qL by any 2×2 unitary matrix  , and qR by any 2×2 unitary matrix .

It decomposes into

The singlet vector symmetry,  acts as 

and thus invariant under  gauge symmetry. This corresponds to baryon number conservation.

The singlet axial group    transforms as the following global transformation

However, it does not correspond to a conserved quantity, because the associated axial current is not conserved. It is explicitly violated by a quantum anomaly.

The remaining chiral symmetry  turns out to be spontaneously broken by a quark condensate 
 formed through nonperturbative action of QCD gluons, into the diagonal vector subgroup SU(2)V known as isospin. The Goldstone bosons corresponding to the three broken generators are the three pions. 
As a consequence, the effective theory of QCD bound states like the baryons, must now include mass terms for them, ostensibly disallowed by unbroken chiral symmetry. Thus, this chiral symmetry breaking induces the bulk of hadron masses, such as those for the nucleons — in effect, the bulk of the mass of all visible matter.

In the real world, because of the nonvanishing and differing masses of the quarks, SU(2)L × SU(2)R is only an approximate symmetry to begin with, and therefore the pions are not massless, but have small masses: they are pseudo-Goldstone bosons.

More flavors
For more  "light" quark species,   flavors  in general, the corresponding chiral symmetries are U(N)L × U(N)R,  decomposing into

and exhibiting a very analogous chiral symmetry breaking pattern.

Most usually,  = 3 is taken, the u, d, and s quarks taken to be light (the Eightfold way (physics)), so then approximately massless for the symmetry to be meaningful to a lowest order, while the other three quarks are sufficiently heavy to barely have a residual chiral symmetry be visible for practical purposes.

An application in particle physics
In theoretical physics, the electroweak model breaks parity maximally. All its fermions are chiral Weyl fermions, which means that the charged weak gauge bosons W and W only couple to left-handed quarks and leptons.

Some theorists found this objectionable, and so conjectured a GUT extension of the weak force which has new, high energy W' and Z' bosons, which do couple with right handed quarks and leptons:

to

Here, SU(2) (pronounced “SU(2) left”) is none other than SU(2) from above, while B−L is the baryon number minus the lepton number. The electric charge formula in this model is given by

There is also the chromodynamic SU(3). The idea was to restore parity by introducing a left-right symmetry.

to the semidirect product

This has two connected components where  acts as an automorphism, which is the composition of an involutive outer automorphism of SU(3) with the interchange of the left and right copies of SU(2) with the reversal of U(1) . It was shown by Mohapatra & Senjanovic (1975) that left-right symmetry can be spontaneously broken to give a chiral low energy theory, which is the Standard Model of Glashow, Weinberg, and Salam, and also connects the small observed neutrino masses to the breaking of left-right symmetry via the seesaw mechanism.

In this setting, the chiral quarks

and

are unified into an irreducible representation (“irrep”)

The leptons are also unified into an irreducible representation

The Higgs bosons needed to implement the breaking of left-right symmetry down to the Standard Model are

This then provides three sterile neutrinos which are perfectly consistent with  neutrino oscillation data. Within the seesaw mechanism, the sterile neutrinos become superheavy without affecting physics at low energies.

Because the left-right symmetry is spontaneously broken, left-right models predict domain walls. This left-right symmetry idea first appeared in the Pati–Salam model (1974) and Mohapatra–Pati models (1975).

See also
Electroweak theory
Chirality (chemistry)
Chirality (mathematics)
Chiral symmetry breaking
Handedness
Spinors and Dirac fields
Sigma model
Chiral model

Notes

References

External links
To see a summary of the differences and similarities between chirality and helicity (those covered here and more) in chart form, one may go to Pedagogic Aids to Quantum Field Theory and click on the link near the bottom of the page entitled "Chirality and Helicity Summary".  To see an in depth discussion of the two with examples, which also shows how chirality and helicity approach the same thing as speed approaches that of light, click the link entitled "Chirality and Helicity in Depth" on the same page.
History of science: parity violation
Helicity, Chirality, Mass, and the Higgs (Quantum Diaries blog)
Chirality vs helicity chart (Robert D. Klauber)

Quantum field theory
Quantum chromodynamics
Symmetry
Chirality